is a Japanese professional drifting driver, who competes  in the D1 Grand Prix series for Dunlop Tyres and Koguchi Power.

Like many of the other D1 drivers, he owns his own tuning garage called Koguchi Power. Yoshinori does all of the work on his car himself. He has a following of Nissan 180SX enthusiasts as he is one of the top 180SX drivers, also his car is the same one that he started out in. His car uses mostly off the shelf parts. His nickname is 'Emperor'.

He has been competing in D1 since it began in 2001 and scored points in his Nissan 180SX in the first three seasons. He then switched to a Nissan Silvia S15 sponsored by tuning firm High Power Improvement, he did not do well in the car or the Toyota Chaser he used after. So in 2007 he changed back to his 180SX and has done well. Usually if he makes it into the top 16 he will score big points, gaining his first win in round 2 of the 2008 season.

Drifting results

D1 Grand Prix

Sources
D1 Grand Prix

Japanese racing drivers
Drifting drivers
1969 births
Living people
D1 Grand Prix drivers